Diglycidyl ethers are chemical compounds used as a reactive diluents for epoxy resin. Other uses include treating textiles and stabilizing chlorinated organic compounds. Diglycidyl ether itself is extremely toxic, and can prove fatal or cause permanent damage if inhaled or consumed orally. As a class of compounds, there are a number of them available commercially with much lower toxicity profiles. One such example is epoxy resin itself Bisphenol A diglycidyl ether

References

 Diglycidyl ether at www.chemicalbook.com.
 CDC - NIOSH Pocket Guide to Chemical Hazards

Glycidyl ethers
Symmetrical ethers
Reactive diluents